Auditions is an Australian television series which aired in 1962, and for which little information is available. Hosted by Wally Peterson (sometimes listed as Wally Petersen), the series aired on Melbourne station HSV-7 for several months. It was described as a "local amateur talent programme". At the time, Australian television was not yet fully networked.

References

External links
Auditions on IMDb

1962 Australian television series debuts
1962 Australian television series endings
Black-and-white Australian television shows
English-language television shows
Australian variety television shows